FPJ's Ang Probinsyano is a 1996 Filipino action film co-written, directed and produced by Fernando Poe Jr., who also stars in twin lead roles. The film was a box office hit. A sequel, Pagbabalik ng Probinsyano, was released in 1998.

Plot
PCpt Ador de León (Fernando Poe Jr.), was killed in a drug bust operation after he was betrayed by his fellow police officer. His superior devises a plan for his twin brother, the provincial cop PLt Ricardo "Kardo" de León (also played by Poe), who is Santa Marcela's police chief, to assume his identity. Kardo eventually outwits and captures the drug syndicate and corrupt policemen responsible for his brother's death.

Cast

Fernando Poe Jr. as PCpt Ador de Leon and PLt Ricardo "Kardo" de Leon
Dindi Gallardo as Lily de Leon
Amanda Page as Carmen Salazar
Amado Cortez as PCol Bernardo
Melisse "Mumay" Santiago as Menchie Salazar
Janus del Prado as Jerry de Leon
Bob Soler as Head of the Syndicate
Zandro Zamora as PMaj Sandoval
Berting Labra as Titong
Romy Diaz as Ben
Marita Zobel as Mrs. Bernardo
Rudy Meyer
Vic Varrion
Joey Padilla as Ben's gang
Nonoy de Guzman as Nonong Noo
Jim Rosales as Santos' gang
Rene Matias as Santos
Robert Rivera as PSMS Halili
Dante Castro as Investigation Officer
Dindo Arroyo as Dado
Renato del Prado as Natong Luga
Ernie Zarate as Investigation Officer
Telly Babasa as Alex
Tom Olivar as Alex's gang
Ding Alvaro as Alex's gang
Kim Laurel as Alex's gang
Tom Alvarez

Sequel

A sequel, Pagbabalik ng Probinsyano, was released almost a year and a half later, directly after the success of the original.

Remake

In 2015, the film was remade by ABS-CBN as a teleserye starring Coco Martin together with an ensemble cast.

Deviations and connections to the TV series
In the film version, Kardo (Cardo in the television series) had a wife and children, who were murdered because the killers had mistaken Kardo for Ador. While on TV series, he was adopted by the Dalisay family.
Ador's guilt was the reason for their separation in the film version. In the TV series version, their grandmother had young Cardo adopted by a childless couple as a condition for the treatment of Cardo's injuries in Singapore.
Ador and Kardo did not have a grandmother in the film. In the TV series, the twins have a grandmother played by veteran actress Susan Roces, widow of the late Fernando Poe Jr.
Kardo's last name in the film version is still de Leon instead of Dalisay.
Cardo in the TV series is a SAF trooper in Botolan with the rank of PO3. In the film version, Kardo is Santa Marcela's Police Chief, with the rank of Lieutenant.
The film's antagonist is a drug syndicate. In the TV series, it is a human-child trafficking syndicate whose line of business shifted to drug production and distribution.
The child Kardo adopted in the film version is a girl, while in the TV series version, it is a boy. Later, Cardo and his family would adopt five more children as part of his expanded family.
In the film, Ador's son is named Jerry; while in the TV series, he named his son after him.
Carmen, a love interest in both the film and the TV series is presented differently between the two versions. In the former, Carmen is a night club entertainer and the mother Menchie, the child Kardo adopts; whereas in the latter, Carmen is the widow of Ador, replacing the film's Lily as Ador's wife.
Salazar is the surname of the film version's Carmen. In the TV series, Guzman is Carmen's maiden name before she married Ador.
The Glen Corpuz character was originally created for the TV series only.
Ador's superior in the film version, who devised the plan for Kardo to assume Ador's identity, is not Ador and Kardo's grand-uncle.
The person who killed Ador in the film version is a syndicate goon. In the TV series, Ador is killed by the main antagonist, a corrupt policeman.
In the film, the main antagonist is a corrupt police official under the payroll of the drug syndicate. In contrast, the main antagonist in the TV series is a corrupt police officer who is one of the leaders and a family member of the human trafficking and drug syndicate.
The Paloma Picache character was created for the TV series only, and was an idea proposed by lead actor Coco Martin to Dreamscape Entertainment. Paloma is actually Cardo in drag which he used to infiltrate a prostitution ring and a sextortionist group.
Janus del Prado, Tom Olivar, Dindo Arroyo, and Joey Padilla were the cast members from the 1996 film who made guest appearances in the TV series. In addition, Daniel Fernando, Ricardo Cepeda, and Jethro Ramirez, who were part of the 1998 film sequel, also made guest appearances in the telenovela. Jaime Fabregas, who served as the musical director for both the film and its sequel, played the role of Cardo and Ador's superior and grand uncle. Likewise, Manny Q. Palo, the writer of the screenplay for the sequel, went on to become one of the directors of the show.

Re-release
A special tribute screening of the film was held on August 20, 2015, in celebration of Poe's 76th birthday and ahead of the premiere of the TV adaptation. The screening was attended by Poe's widow, Susan Roces, their daughter, Senator Grace Poe and her son, Brian Llamanzares, along with the cast of the series Coco Martin, Maja Salvador, Bela Padilla and Jaime Fabregas who also served as the film's musical director.

References

External links

1996 films
1996 action films
Films about twin brothers
Films about the illegal drug trade
Films about organized crime
Films with screenplays by Pablo S. Gomez
Philippine action films
Films directed by Fernando Poe Jr.